Muzeina is a station currently under construction on the Dnipro Metro's Tsentralno–Zavodska Line. Deputy Mayor of Dnipro Mykhailo Lysenko stated in December 2020 that it was estimated to be opened in 2024. The station is named for its proximity next to the city's historical museum.

History
The station was already envisioned in the 1980 official planning of the city's metro lines, the station referred to as "Studentska". It was originally scheduled to be opened in 1993, the station's construction was delayed significantly after the fall of the Soviet Union.  Budget issues and economic instability in Ukraine further delayed the station's opening.

As an expansion of the current Dnipro Metro expansion the station was projected to be opened by 2015. But construction was stopped because the tender to select the contractor was stopped by the city council in August 2015.

The station is located deep underground in the center of Dnipro, and is located right after  station, which is another station currently under construction. It is not known what final form the station will take on; whether it will be a deep column or a single-vault station.

References

External links
 (Images of the station under construction) 

Dnipro Metro stations
Railway stations scheduled to open in 2024